The Büchergilde-Essaypreis was a literary prize awarded annually by Büchergilde Gutenberg, a German book sales club. From 2000 to 2006 an independent panel judged original essays responding to a prompt, usually focussing on social issues.

Themes
 2000 "Chancengleichheit, Sozialpartnerschaft, Gerechtigkeit – Werte mit Zukunft?" (Equal opportunity, social partnership, justice — values with a future?)
 2002 "Sehnsucht nach Sinn? Lebensziele und Wertvorstellungen im vereinten Europa." (A desire for meaning? Goals and values in a unified Europe.)
 2004 "Eine egoistische Gesellschaft? Leben zwischen Individualismus und Solidarität." (An egoistic society? Living with the contrast between individualism and solidarity.)
 2006 "Glaube, Liebe, Hoffnung – Die Rolle der Religion in einer individualisierten Gesellschaft." (Faith, love, hope — religion’s role in an individualised society.)

Winners
 2000 Norbert Olah
 2002 Verena Richter, Thomas Hajduk (tie)
 2004 Maren Hombrecher
 2006 Michaela Schröder

German non-fiction literary awards
2000 establishments in Germany
2006 disestablishments in Germany
Awards established in 2000
Awards disestablished in 2006